Strabane F.C. was a Northern Irish football club from the town of Strabane, County Tyrone. The club was founded in 1961 by John Madden, Billy Harte, John McCrossan, Richard McGinley, Billy Wallace and Eamon McColgan as Strabane F.C.. In 2010 the club merged with Sion Swifts and were known as Strabane and Sion Swifts United but that club folded in 2012.

The club played in the Irish Cup.

Honours

Intermediate honours
Craig Memorial Cup: 2
1987-88, 2003–04

1961 establishments in Northern Ireland
2012 disestablishments in Northern Ireland
Association football clubs established in 1961
Association football clubs disestablished in 2012